NPower is a national nonprofit 501(c)(3) organization that provides free tech training for careers in Information Technology to military veterans and young adults from under-served communities. Their mission is to move people from poverty to the middle class by creating access and pathways to careers in technology fields. 

Founded in 2000 in New York City, NPower currently operates in New York City (Brooklyn, Harlem), New Jersey (Newark, Jersey City), Maryland (Baltimore East & West), Missouri (St. Louis North & Midtown), Michigan (Detroit), Texas (Dallas), California (San Jose) and Canada. To date, it has served over 5,000 people.

Programs 
The NPower signature training model includes: 

Tech Fundamentals – A 23-week program consisting of 16 weeks of in-class (or virtual) instruction and professional skill-building, followed by a 7-week paid internship or virtual project. Coursework focuses on basic Information Technology (IT) competencies for entry-level tech employment. 

Advanced Certifications– Multiple paths for advanced IT coursework and certification including Cybersecurity, Coding, and Cloud computing.

NPower provides a range of social service support (housing referrals, technology equipment, clothing donations, travel assistance, etc.) to students during their tenure in the program.

Leadership 
Bertina Ceccarelli is NPower's current CEO. She joined the organization in May 2016.

NPower's current board chairperson is David Reilly, former Chief Information Officer, Global Banking and Markets at Bank of America. Vice-chair of the national board is Matt Horner, Executive Vice President of Global Enterprise Sales at World Wide Technology.

NPower’s National Advisory Council includes executive volunteers who support and guide innovative ways to anticipate future trends in NPower’s programs and curriculum.

Each NPower region maintains a regional advisory board of esteemed technology executives from around the country.

History 
NPower was founded in 2000 in partnership with Microsoft, JPMorgan Chase, and Accenture, with the original goal of providing tech support for nonprofits. In 2002, it began its first training programs out of New York, which have evolved into national program offerings.

2000 - NPower is founded with the mission of deploying trained tech support to nonprofits in New York.
2002 - NPower launches its first core training program for young adults in New York, later relocating to Brooklyn.
2011 - NPower New York opens a second location in Harlem.
2013 - NPower Texas opens in Dallas and launches its first program for military veterans.
2014 - NPower California opens in the San Francisco Bay Area to serve veterans. NPower Canada opens in Toronto to serve young adults.
2015 - NPower New Jersey opens to serve young adults and veterans.
2016 - NPower Maryland opens in Baltimore to serve young adults.
2017 - NPower Missouri opens in St. Louis to serve young adults.
2019 - NPower New Jersey opens Newark location. NPower Michigan opens first location in Detroit to serve young adults. NPower Maryland expands to West Baltimore. NPower Missouri expands to North St. Louis. 
2020 - In response to the COVID-19 global pandemic, NPower adapts its programs to virtual training.

Events and fundraisers 
NPower hosts an annual fundraising gala each fall. Other events include regional graduations each summer and winter.

References

External links

501(c)(3) organizations
Non-profit organizations based in New York City
Educational organizations based in the United States